Dzmitry Gomza (born 3 May 1987) is a Belarusian professional footballer who plays for Bumprom Gomel.

Honours 
Gomel
 Belarusian Cup winner: 2021–22
 Belarusian Super Cup winner: 2012

External links 
 
 

1987 births
Living people
People from Baranavichy
Sportspeople from Brest Region
Belarusian footballers
Association football forwards
FC Torpedo-BelAZ Zhodino players
FC Bereza-2010 players
FC Baranovichi players
FC Vitebsk players
FC Gomel players
FC Gorodeya players
FC Slonim-2017 players
FC Lokomotiv Gomel players
FC Belshina Bobruisk players
FC Smolevichi players